Israel competed at the 1956 Summer Olympics in Melbourne, Australia.

Results by event

Athletics

Diving

Swimming

References

Nations at the 1956 Summer Olympics
1956 Summer Olympics
Summer Olympics